Ryan Michael Fazio (born March 27, 1990) is an American businessman and politician who is a member of the Connecticut State Senate for the 36th district. A Republican, he won election in 2021 following the resignation of Democratic member Alexandra Kasser.

Early life and education 
Fazio was born in Norwalk, Connecticut, a son of Michael and Madeline (née Gadaleta). His father, Michael A. Fazio, has been a former long-term partner of Arthur Andersen, LLP and managing director of Houlihan Lokey, and now private equity investor residing in Texas. His parents are divorced. He is of Italian descent. 

Fazio grew up in Greenwich, Connecticut. He graduated from Greenwich High School in 2008 and subsequently earned a Bachelor of Arts degree in Economics from Northwestern University in 2012.

Professional career 
After college, Fazio became an investment advisor.

Politics 
He was subsequently elected to the Greenwich RTM.

On August 17, 2021, Fazio defeated Democratic lawyer Alexis Gevanter of Greenwich in a special election to fill the 36th district seat, which Alexandra Kasser  vacated two months prior. His election has ended the Democratic supermajority in the State Senate. He was the Republican nominee for the same seat in the 2020 Connecticut State Senate elections. Connecticut's 36th district covers Greenwich and parts of Stamford and New Canaan.

Electoral history

Personal life 
Fazio is a resident of the Riverside section of Greenwich, Connecticut.

References

Living people
People from Norwalk, Connecticut
Northwestern University alumni
Republican Party Connecticut state senators
21st-century American politicians
1990 births